Tell Karmita is an archaeological site 4km north of Bar Elias, on the Zahle road in the Beqaa Mohafazat (Governorate), Lebanon. It dates at least to the Neolithic with early Iron Age materials also found.

References

Archaeological sites in Lebanon
Iron Age Asia
Neolithic Asia
Neolithic settlements
Baalbek District
Great Rift Valley